Yekyiu Pagoda, officially known as the Lay Kyun Man Aung Phaung Daw U Pagoda, is a Buddhist pagoda in Pathein, Ayeyarwady Region, Myanmar (Burma).

See also
 Shwemokhtaw Pagoda
Buddhism in Myanmar

References

Pagodas in Myanmar
Buildings and structures in Ayeyarwady Region